The Yantai Sports Park Stadium is a multi-use stadium in Yantai, China. It is currently used mostly for association football matches, and also for athletics and rugby sevens. The stadium has a capacity of 40,000.

Footnotes

Football venues in China
Sports venues in Shandong